The Association of Jesuit Colleges and Universities  (AJCU) is a consortium of the 28 Jesuit colleges and universities and three theological centers in the United States, Canada, and Belize committed to advancing academic excellence by promoting and coordinating collaborative activities, sharing resources, and advocating and representing the work of Jesuit higher education at the national and international levels. It is headquartered in Washington, D.C. and led by the Association's president, Rev. Michael J. Garanzini, S.J.

Although each institution is legally autonomous under independent boards of trustees and separately chartered by respective states, the 28 schools and three theological schools share common Jesuit ideals and traditions.  They also engage in a number of collaborative projects.

Members

Note: In 2019, Wheeling Jesuit University became disaffiliated from the Maryland Province of the Society of Jesus; in 2020, St. John's College in Belize became a full member of AJCU.

Gallery

See also
 Jesuits in the United States
Alpha Sigma Nu - honor society for students at Jesuit institutions of higher education
Gamma Pi Epsilon - defunct honor society for women at Jesuit institutions of higher education
List of Jesuit institutions
Jesuit Ivy

References

External links

College and university associations and consortia in the United States
1970 establishments in Washington, D.C.